The Ordnance ML 4.2-inch mortar was a heavy mortar used by the British Army during and after World War II.

History 
The  mortar was a smooth-bore weapon of the Stokes pattern and was designed by the Armaments Research and Development Establishment and produced by the Royal Ordnance Factories. It entered widespread British service in 1942, equipping chemical warfare companies of the Royal Engineers (RE). The Mark 3 became the standard model.

The first combat use was at Second Battle of El Alamein, when the 66th Mortar Company (RE) was attached to the Australian 24th Infantry Brigade. During the battle, 66 Mortar Company provided intense, effective supporting fire on the 24th Brigade's exposed right flank, as the infantry advanced, expending all of the 4.2-inch HE mortar ammunition in the theatre.

Around mid-1943, the Royal Engineer chemical warfare companies were disbanded as an emergency expedient and one heavy mortar company of each infantry division machine-gun battalion was equipped with the mortar. This company was organized with sixteen 4.2-inch mortars, in four platoons of four mortars each. In early 1944, divisions in Italy also held a pool of mortars for issue to other units as needed, usually troops in the divisional anti-tank regiment, some regiments even converted one or more batteries to mortars.

Ordnance ML 4.2-inch mortars were slower to reach Commonwealth forces in the Pacific and Asia. Australian Army units in the South West Pacific theatre were reportedly the first to receive them, before forces in Burma.

Postwar 
After World War II, the mortars were handed over to the Royal Artillery, the 170th Mortar Battery used them at the Battle of Imjin River in Korea. They were used during the 1950s, also by airborne artillery, deployed to Kuwait in 1961 and manned by soldiers from air defence batteries during the Confrontation in Borneo in 1965.

Description 
The 4.2-inch mortar entered production at the end of 1941 with a standard base plate and tripod. The normal detachment was six men and it was transported with ammunition in a 10 cwt trailer, usually towed behind a Loyd Carrier. There was also an auxiliary base plate that fitted around it, to increase its area for use on softer ground. Later an integrated trailer/base plate was developed, called the Mk 1 Mobile Baseplate. The wheels, which were on suspension arms, were unlocked and raised for firing; the Mk1/1 had detachable wheels and the barrel with tripod attached, was stowed on top for towing. The mobile base plate trailer mounting could be brought into action by 2 men. Regarding rate of fire, one source reports a crew putting 23 bombs in the air before the first impacted.

Ammunition 
Both HE (9.1 kg) and smoke (10.2 kg) ammunition was used. Smoke included WP and Base Ejection, and in World War II other types for practice. Two charges were available. In World War II, both streamlined and cylindrical bombs were available. Chemical munitions included the MK I chemical mortar bomb with Mustard gas (HS or HT fillings).

Users 
World War II
 
 
 
Postwar

Gallery

See also

Weapons of comparable role, performance and era 
 M2 4.2 inch mortar – US equivalent
 107mm M1938 mortar – Soviet equivalent

Notes

References 
 
 
 
 Maintenance Manual for ML 2-inch, ML 3-inch and SB 4.2-inch mortars

External links 

 

Mortars of the United Kingdom
World War II infantry mortars of the United Kingdom
107 mm artillery
United Kingdom chemical weapons program
Chemical weapon delivery systems
Weapons and ammunition introduced in 1942